Ceryx pleurasticta is a moth of the subfamily Arctiinae. It was described by George Hampson in 1901. It is found in India.

References

Ceryx (moth)
Moths described in 1901